The Telangana Legislative Assembly election was held in Telangana on 7 December 2018 to constitute the second Legislative Assembly since the formation of the state in 2014. The incumbent Telangana Rashtra Samithi, Indian National Congress, Bharatiya Janata Party, Telangana Jana Samithi, and Telugu Desam Party were the main contestants in the election.  

The four opposition parties in the state, INC, TJS, TDP and CPI announced the formation of a 'Maha Kootami' (Grand Alliance), to defeat the ruling TRS in the elections. However, the Maha Kootami could not win a majority; the TRS won and formed the government once again

Background
K. Chandrashekar Rao went for early elections in 2018, when he resigned 6 September 2018, nine months before the completion of his term.

Since no other party had a majority, the house was dissolved by the governor and general elections were announced.

This election led to the alliance of Telugu Desam Party (TDP) and Indian National Congress (INC), Communist Party of India (CPI) once arch rivals, coming together as part of Praja or Maha Kutami for the first time.

Electoral process changes (E.C.I)
Election Commission of India announced that Voter-verified paper audit trail (VVPAT) machines will be used in all 32,574 polling stations in the assembly elections in Telangana. According to the final electoral rolls published on 12 October 2018, Telangana has 2,80,64,680 voters, which is less than 2,81,65,885 voters in 2014 Telangana assembly elections. There were around 2,600+ transgenders in the voters list.

Schedule 
The date of the election was 7 December 2018 and the result were to be out on 11 December 2018.

Results

Results by party

Results by district

Results by constituency

See also
2018 elections in India
List of constituencies of Telangana Legislative Assembly

References 

2018
Telangana
2010s in Telangana